Lorraine American Cemetery and Memorial is a Second World War American military war grave cemetery, located just outside Saint-Avold, Moselle, France. It is administered by the American Battle Monuments Commission.

History
During and shortly after the war over 16,000 American casualties were interred across the Saint Avold region in France. Those interred at the Lorraine American Cemetery died mostly in the autumn of 1944 during the Allied advance from Paris to the Rhine as the Americans sought to expel the Germans from  fortress city of Metz and advance on the Siegfried Line during the latter stages of World War II. They were mainly part of the U.S. Third and Seventh Armies.

In the late 1940s many bodies from the Saint Avold region were repatriated to the US or concentrated at Lorraine.

Layout
The cemetery's headstones are arranged in nine plots forming an elliptical design ending with an overlook feature. A memorial has ceramic operations maps with narratives and service flags. Either side of the memorial are Tablets of the Missing commemorating 444 soldiers missing in action (rosettes mark those since recovered and identified).

Notable burials
 Medal of Honor recipients
 Sergeant Salvador J. Lara (1920–1945), awarded the medal in 2014
 Sergeant Andrew Miller (1916–1944), awarded the medal in 1945
 Private Frederick C. Murphy (1918–1945), awarded the medal in 1946
 Sergeant Ruben Rivers (c. 1921–1944), awarded the medal in 1977
 Lieutenant David C. Waybur (1919–1945), awarded the medal in 1943 and killed in action 19 months later
 Others
 Lieutenant Al Blozis (1919–1945), football player
 Lieutenant Willard Bowsky (1907–1944), animator
 Private Charley Havlat (1910–1945), last American to die before the German surrender on 7 May
 Major George Preddy (1919–1944), flying ace, buried next to his brother Lieutenant William Preddy (1924–1945)

Anecdote: Sheltered from view, hidden by trees in a place a little apart, is a small vegetable garden created in 1962 by Bouaroua Aissa, gardener of the cemetery. More than 60 years later, this garden still exists and is maintained by another gardener who perpetuates Aissa's work.

Gallery

References

External links
 American Battle Monuments Commission home page
 ABMC Lorraine Cemetery video .wmv
 ABMC Lorraine Cemetery booklet .pdf
 Lorraine American Cemetery and Memorial Flickr group
 

World War II memorials in France
World War II cemeteries in France
American Battle Monuments Commission
Buildings and structures in Moselle (department)
1944 establishments in France
Cemeteries in Grand Est
Tourist attractions in Moselle (department)